George Gerald Seifert (born January 22, 1940) is an American former football coach and player. He served as the head coach for the San Francisco 49ers and the Carolina Panthers of the National Football League (NFL). Seifert owned the second-greatest winning percentage in NFL history by a head coach at the time of his resignation as the 49ers head coach, second to Guy Chamberlin. Among coaches with at least 100 wins, his winning percentage in fifth best in football history.

Early career
Seifert was raised in San Francisco and ushered at 49ers home games at Kezar Stadium while he attended San Francisco Polytechnic High School across the street. He attended the University of Utah, playing guard and linebacker for the Utes. He served as graduate assistant at his alma mater for a year before being hired as head coach of Westminster College in Salt Lake City at age 25, where he led the Parsons to a 3–3 record.

After working as an assistant at the University of Iowa, the University of Oregon, and Stanford University, Seifert was hired as head coach at Cornell University. He was fired after going 3–15 in two seasons. He then returned to Stanford in 1977, where he met Bill Walsh. When Walsh moved to the 49ers in 1979, Seifert joined his coaching staff the following year as the team's defensive backs coach. Seifert was promoted to defensive coordinator in 1983.

As a 49er assistant, Seifert defenses finished in the top ten in fewest points allowed in each of his six seasons in that capacity: fourth in 1983, first in 1984, second in 1985, third in 1986 and 1987, and eighth in 1988. His final two defenses, 1987 and 1988, finished first and third in fewest yards allowed, respectively.

Head coaching career

San Francisco 49ers (1989–1996)
On Seifert's 49th birthday, the 49ers won Super Bowl XXIII. Seifert was promoted to succeed Walsh as 49ers head coach the following season. He is one of only 13 NFL head coaches with more than one Super Bowl victory, winning in both the 1989 and 1994 seasons with the San Francisco 49ers. In Super Bowl XXIV he became the first rookie head coach to win the Super Bowl since Don McCafferty coached the Baltimore Colts to victory in Super Bowl V. In all, Seifert coached on five Super Bowl champion teams with the 49ers.

Despite owning the best winning percentage of any NFL head coach in the league's history, 49ers management did not offer an extension on Seifert's contract. 49ers team president Carmen Policy desired to hire Cal Bears head coach Steve Mariucci to the same position in the 49ers organization. Policy offered Seifert the opportunity to remain head coach for the final year of his contract, with Mariucci serving as offensive coordinator and head coach-in-waiting. Seifert then resigned. His 98 wins are still the most in franchise history.

Carolina Panthers (1999–2001)
After two years out of the game, Seifert was hired by the Carolina Panthers as head coach. He was also de facto general manager as well; the Panthers hadn't had a general manager since Bill Polian's departure in 1997.  During his first training camp with the Panthers, he told his players that they shouldn't act like wildebeests.  He explained that wildebeests usually give up when caught by a lion.  "Don't be that wildebeest," he said. "Don't give up."

In his first season, Seifert led the Panthers to an 8–8 record, a four-game improvement from 1998. The most notable play of that year came when quarterback Steve Beuerlein scored a game-winning touchdown on a fourth-and-five quarterback draw with five seconds left in the fourth quarter to defeat the Green Bay Packers. The Panthers went into the final day of the regular season in contention for a playoff berth; however, their victory margin over the New Orleans Saints needed to be 18 points greater than the Packers' margin over the Arizona Cardinals in order to make the playoffs.  While the Panthers routed the Saints 45–13, the Packers beat the Cardinals 49–24, leaving the Packers ahead on point differential and eliminating the Panthers.

The Panthers were competitive for most of 2000 as well but needed to win their season finale against the Oakland Raiders to finish at .500. Instead, the Raiders won in a 52–9 rout, still one of the most lopsided losses in Carolina history. Seifert presided over the 2001 NFL Draft, which netted the Panthers Steve Smith and Kris Jenkins, two cornerstones of the franchise.  Behind rookie quarterback Chris Weinke, they defeated the Minnesota Vikings, 24–13, in the 2001 season opener; however, they did not win another game all season and finished at 1–15, the worst record in franchise history. The 15 consecutive losses was an NFL record for futility until the 2008 Detroit Lions went 0–16.  The Panthers' final two games were played before what are still the two smallest crowds in franchise history (in terms of turnstile count), including a 38–6 loss to the New England Patriots that drew only 21,000 people. Following the game, Seifert announced that he was planning to return for the 2002 season, but was fired the next morning.
 
Seifert is the first head coach since the implementation of the 16-game schedule in place from 1978 to 2020 to guide a team to 15 consecutive losses following a Week 1 victory. Seifert's dubious distinction would be matched by Doug Marrone of the 2020 Jacksonville Jaguars.

To date, Seifert and Matt Rhule (2020–2022) are the only Panthers coaches to have never had a winning season or coached a playoff game.

Head coaching record

National Football League

College

Broadcasting stint
CBS Sports hired Seifert to serve as a panelist for The NFL Today in its first season after CBS regained NFL broadcast rights (for the AFC) in 1998. His performance was not well received, however, and the network removed him before the end of the regular season.

Personal life
Seifert currently resides in Bodega Bay, California, with his wife Linda. They have two children, Eve and Jason.

See also
 List of National Football League head coaches with 50 wins
 List of Super Bowl head coaches

References

1940 births
Living people
American football offensive linemen
Carolina Panthers head coaches
Coaches of American football from California
Cornell Big Red football coaches
Iowa Hawkeyes football coaches
Oregon Ducks football coaches
Players of American football from San Francisco
San Francisco 49ers coaches
San Francisco 49ers head coaches
Stanford Cardinal football coaches
Super Bowl-winning head coaches
Utah Utes football coaches
Utah Utes football players
Westminster Parsons football coaches